Proboscidoidea is a suborder of hydrozoans in the order Leptothecata. It includes three families and near 150 distinct species. They are characterized by elongated and undercut hypostome that creates an indention superior to the gastric cavity.

References

Leptothecata
Cnidarian suborders